R339 road may refer to:
 R339 road (Ireland)
 R339 road (South Africa)